The Bishop of Kilmacduagh was an episcopal title which took its name after the village of Kilmacduagh in County Galway, Ireland. In both the Church of Ireland and the Roman Catholic Church, the title is now united with other bishoprics.

History
In the seventh century, the monastery of Kilmacduagh was founded by Saint Colman, son of Duagh. It was not until 1152 that the Diocese of Kilmacduagh was established at the Synod of Kells. After the Reformation, there were parallel apostolic successions. 

In the Church of Ireland
The Church of Ireland bishopric of Kilmacduagh was united with Clonfert to form the united bishopric of Clonfert and Kilmacduagh in 1625. Under the Church Temporalities (Ireland) Act 1833, the united see became part of the bishopric of Killaloe and Clonfert in 1834. Since 1976, Kilmacduagh has been one of the sees held by the Bishop of Limerick and Killaloe.

In the Roman Catholic Church
The Roman Catholic Church bishopric of Kilmacduagh continued as a separate title until 1750 when Pope Benedict XIV decreed that it be united with the bishopric of Kilfenora. The bishop of the united dioceses was to be alternately bishop of one diocese and apostolic administrator of the other, since the two dioceses were in different ecclesiastical provinces. The first bishop under this new arrangement was Peter Kilkelly, who had been Bishop of Kilmacduagh since 1744, became Apostolic Administrator of Kilfenora in September 1750. Since 1883, the two sees have been part of the united Diocese of Galway, Kilmacduagh and Kilfenora.

Pre-Reformation bishops

Bishops during the Reformation

Post-Reformation bishops

Church of Ireland succession

Roman Catholic succession

References

Kilmacduagh
Kilmacduagh
Religion in County Galway
Kilmacduagh